Millie Essie Gibson Hale (1881–June 6, 1930) was an American nurse and hospital administrator. In 1916 she founded Millie E. Hale Hospital with her husband, John Henry Hale, M.D., in Nashville, Tennessee.

Early life and education 
Millie E. Gibson was born in Nashville, Tennessee, and graduated from Fisk University's Normal School. She received her nursing degree from the Graduate School for Nurses in New York City.

Career 
In 1916 she and her husband founded a hospital which was the first in Nashville to treat African-American patients year round. At the time, African-Americans were denied care at other hospitals due to financial and racial discrimination. Hale served as the hospital's head nurse and administrator. In addition to these responsibilities, she created a monthly newspaper educating people on health issues, set up programs for prenatal care and nurse training, bought land for playgrounds, and eventually transformed the Hale home into a community center. The hospital was open for over two decades and closed eight years after her death in 1930. It started with only a 12-bed hospital and it grew to 75 beds and thousands of patients were treated there from all over the South.

Personal life and legacy 
Mrs, Hal e is a member of Alpha Kappa Alpha Sorority, Incorporated.  Hale and her husband John Henry Hale had two daughters, Mildred and Essie. Millie E. Hale died in 1930, aged 49 years, in Nashville. The Hales were inducted into the Tennessee Health Care Hall of Fame at Belmont University on October 16, 2018.

References 

1881 births
1930 deaths
Hospital administrators
Fisk University alumni
American nurses